Elaina Oden (born March 21, 1967 in Orange, California) is a former volleyball player from the United States, who won the bronze medal with the United States women's national volleyball team at the 1992 Summer Olympics in Barcelona, Spain.

Oden attended Irvine High School in Irvine, California, and was a standout in volleyball, basketball, soccer, softball, and track & field, where she was California State champion in the shot put her senior year. As a senior she was named the School's Athlete of the Year. Her sisters Kim and Beverly were also outstanding volleyball players.

Elaina Oden is remembered as one of the most decorated women's volleyball players in University of the Pacific history.  Oden was the key player on Pacific's back-to-back NCAA national championship teams.  Highlights of those seasons included defeats of UCLA and Stanford for the NCAA title in 1985 and the steamrolling of Texas and Nebraska en route to the 1986 crown.

Oden is Pacific's all-time single season hitting percentage leader (.380 in 1985) and she was named PCAA Most Valuable Player in 1985.  Until recently, Elaina held the Pacific single season kill record (547) and the all-time career kills mark (1,485).  Oden's .357 hitting percentage in 1986 places her third on Pacific's all-time list.

In leading the Tigers to back-to-back NCAA Championships, Oden was named an All-America at the middle blocker position in both 1985 and 1986 as the Tigers amassed a combined record of 75-6.  Volleyball Monthly recognized her as its 1986 National Player of the Year.  Elaina added a third All-America honor in 1989, helping the Tigers to a record of 29-5. She is one of four Tiger volleyball players to have their jersey number retired by the Pacific Athletic Department.

When it comes to career records, the seven-year member of the United States National Team currently ranks second in career hitting percentage (.341), third in digs (1,229), third in block solos (138), fourth in block assists (396), and fourth in total blocks (534).  In addition, Oden set the Pacific freshman record of 547 kills in 1985.

During her tenure on the U.S. National Team, Oden played in the 1992 Olympics in Barcelona, Spain, and the 1996 Olympics in Atlanta, Georgia.  She also competed in the 1986 Goodwill Games and the 1986 World Championships.  Elaina was a member of the U.S. Junior National Team in 1985 and was nominated for the NCAA's Broderick Award in 1985 and 1986.

References

1967 births
American women's volleyball players
Living people
Olympic bronze medalists for the United States in volleyball
Volleyball players at the 1992 Summer Olympics
Volleyball players at the 1996 Summer Olympics
Pacific Tigers women's volleyball players
Sportspeople from Irvine, California
Medalists at the 1992 Summer Olympics
Competitors at the 1986 Goodwill Games
Pan American Games medalists in volleyball
Pan American Games silver medalists for the United States
Medalists at the 1995 Pan American Games